Lars Käll (19 November 1933 – 27 July 2009) was a Swedish sailor. He competed in the Flying Dutchman event at the 1964 Summer Olympics.

References

External links
 

1933 births
2009 deaths
Swedish male sailors (sport)
Olympic sailors of Sweden
Sailors at the 1964 Summer Olympics – Flying Dutchman
Sportspeople from Stockholm